Karan (Qaran) is a rural locality (a village) and the administrative centre of Meleuzovsky Selsoviet, Meleuzovsky District, Bashkortostan, Russia. The population was 377 as of 2010. There are 7 streets.

Geography 
Karan is located 4 km south of Meleuz (the district's administrative centre) by road. Kuzminskoye is the nearest rural locality.

References 

Rural localities in Meleuzovsky District